Lole y Manuel was a gitano (Spanish Romani) musical duo formed by Dolores Montoya Rodríguez (1954) and Manuel Molina Jiménez (1948-2015). They composed and performed innovative flamenco music between 1972 and 1993.

This couple was the first exponent of flamenco music aimed at a non-exclusively flamenco audience. They were one of the first precursors of the musical stream called "New flamenco".

Lole and Manuel were married, and were a professional couple. Manuel Molina and Dolores Montoya are members of Romani families of artistic descent. Manuel was the son of Manuel Molina Acosta, better known as "El Encajero", who was a professional guitar player.
Lole is the daughter of flamenco singer and dancer Antonia Rodríguez Moreno, better known as "La Negra", and her father was the dancer Juan Montoya. Their daughter is the singer Alba Molina.

Their groundbreaking first album Nuevo Día, decisively produced by flamenco producer Ricardo Pachón, fused traditional Spanish flamenco with Molina's poetic lyrics and foreign styles and influences. The music is recognized for the emotive, yet sweet voice of Lole Montoya and the operatic, flashy guitar of Manuel.

The music of Lole and Manuel is present in the cinema in films as significant as "Manuela"  by Gonzalo García Pelayo, "Flamenco" by Carlos Saura or "Siesta"  by Mary Lambert, and In the 2018 documentary film Camarón: Flamenco y Revolución, from the Spanish director Alexis Morante , released through Netflix. Their 1975 track, "Tu Mirá" (“your look” or “your gaze”, "Mirá" being a non-standard form of "mirada", undergoing elision of the 'd' and then a merger of the double 'a'), features one of Montoya's most emotive vocal performances, accompanied by a large choir and an epic organ (in addition to Manuel's guitar), is included on the soundtrack for Quentin Tarantino's Kill Bill: Volume 2.

Now,  Lole has completed the details of her new album with the guitarist from Jerez de la Frontera, Diego Del Morao.

On May 19, 2015, Manuel Molina died at the age of 67 at his home in San Juan de Aznalfarache, Spain.

Discography 
 Nuevo Día/El Origen De Una Leyenda (1975)
 Pasaje del Agua (1976)
 Lole y Manuel (1977)
 Al Alba Con Alegría (1980). Acompañados por Imán, Califato Independiente.
 Casta (1984)
 Lole y Manuel Cantan a Manuel de Falla (1992)
 Alba Molina (1994)
 Una Voz y Una Guitarra. Grabado en directo desde el Teatro Monumental de Madrid (1995).

References

External links 
Interview with Lole Montoya
Lole y Manuel´s flamenco soul

Spanish musical duos
Flamenco groups
Romani musical groups
Male–female musical duos